American blues musician Robert Johnson (1911–1938) recorded 29 songs during his brief career. A total of 59 performances, including alternate takes, were recorded over a period of five days at two makeshift recording studios in Texas. Producers selected 25, which Vocalion Records issued on 12 two-sided 78 rpm record singles between 1937 and 1939. These went out-of-print, but were the only source of Johnson's work until his recordings were eventually issued on albums beginning in 1959. In addition to those on the original singles, another 17 recordings have been released (five additional songs and 12 alternate takes).

In 1990, Columbia Records issued the first comprehensive collection of Johnson's work, The Complete Recordings. Although some of Johnson's 78s sold relatively well for their time, Columbia's box set became a best seller. It reached number 80 on the main American pop album chart and sold over one million copies in the U.S. by 1994. In 2011, for the centennial of Johnson's birth, Columbia remastered and reissued the set with an additional recording. Stephen LaVere, who manages Johnson's recording legacy and produced the collections, believes that uncovering additional performances is unlikely: "If any additional material was recorded, it is expected that nothing survived; that if anything did, it would have surfaced long before now [2011]... but one never knows. Stranger things have happened."

Sessionography

Johnson's first recording session took place on Monday, November 23, 1936, in San Antonio, Texas. A makeshift studio had been set up in the Gunter Hotel, where the recording equipment was located in one room and a second, Room 414, was where the musicians performed. Johnson was the only one to record that day and performed solo, singing and accompanying himself on acoustic guitar. Two more sessions followed, on Thursday and Friday, November 27 and 28. After the successful release of "Terraplane Blues" in March 1937, additional recording sessions took place in Dallas, Texas. On Saturday and Sunday, June 19 and 20, 1937, Johnson, again performing solo, was recorded in an unused storage area on the third floor of the former Vitagraph and Warner Bros. building.

The sessions were overseen by Art Satherley, who was a producer for the American Record Corporation (ARC) and Vocalion Records in New York City. He arranged for Don Law to produce the actual recording sessions, with recording engineer Vincent Liebler.  While it was standard practice for an individual in Law's position to guide musicians during recording, it is not known what, if any, input he had in shaping Johnson's material.  However, Law had Johnson record additional performances (or alternate takes) for each of his songs.  Law's recollection that Johnson performed facing the wall led some early writers to conclude that he was "extremely shy" or "suffering from a bad case of stage fright". Guitarist Ry Cooder added to the speculation that Johnson was using a technique referred to as "corner loading" to enhance his guitar sound for the recordings.  However, both ideas are refuted by Bruce Conforth and Gayle Dean Wardlow, authors of a 2019 biography of Johnson. They note that Johnson only turned his back on one occasion when asked to play for other musicians who were in the studio, following his practice of shielding his techniques from scrutiny by other guitarists. Session logs show that a total of 59 of Johnson's performances were recorded (two takes of each song plus one third take), but only 42 have been found and the rest are believed to be "lost to the ages".

Discography

Singles

Johnson's records were initially issued on 78 rpm record singles by Vocalion, one of several labels that specialized in jazz and blues.  These were supplemented with pressings from ARC's budget labels, Perfect Records, Oriole Records, Romeo Records, and Conqueror Records, which were sold through variety retailers or "dime stores". Although it was thought that several alternate takes might have been issued by these labels, for the 2011 Centennial Collection, LaVere notes that only one, "Kind Hearted Woman Blues" (the flip-side of "Terraplane Blues") was actually issued with both takes. When Columbia Records bought ARC in early 1938, the budget labels were discontinued and Johnson's records were issued on the Vocalion label into 1939. These early 78s were the source of Johnson's music until his songs were later released on long playing (LP) record albums.

There has been some speculation that Johnson's recordings had been sped up for the singles. However, this idea has been debunked by biographer Elijah Wald, who cited several reasons and concluded:

Albums
In 1959, "Preachin' Blues" (Johnson's last Vocalion single), was the first of his recordings to appear on an album. Folkways Records included it on a compilation of songs by early blues musicians, titled The Country Blues. In 1961, Columbia released King of the Delta Blues Singers, the first album to feature Johnson exclusively. It includes a mix of recordings originally issued on 78s and previously unreleased material. A follow-up album, King of the Delta Blues Singers, Vol. II was issued in 1970, again with some original and unreleased recordings.

In 1990, Columbia issued a comprehensive box set, titled The Complete Recordings. With 41 recordings, it contained all of Johnson recordings known at the time. However, a second take of "Traveling Riverside Blues" was discovered and released with the reissue of King of the Delta Blues Singers in 1998. When The Complete Recordings was updated in 2011 for the centennial of Johnson's birth, the extra track was included, bringing the total to 42. LaVere believes that this represents all of Johnson's remaining recordings, but leaves open the possibility that more may exist.

In countries with different copyright rules, record companies other than Columbia have issued their own collections of Johnson's recordings. William Ruhlmann explained in an AllMusic review:

These are not supposed to be sold in the U.S., where Johnson's recordings are still copyright protected. However, inexpensive imports are often available, but may lack quality sound and liner notes.

Commercial performance
Billboard magazine did not begin publishing its first record chart that tracked blues releases until 1942, after Johnson's records were out-of-print. Recordings by blues artists were not broadcast on radio, however, they were common in jukeboxes in the South, so their popularity is not solely reflected in the numbers pressed or sold (Billboards first "Race Records" jukebox chart did not appear until 1945).

Pressing and sales statistics for Vocalion are not available, but Johnson's first record, "Terraplane Blues" backed with "Kind Hearted Woman Blues", is regarded as his most successful. It may have sold 10,000 copies, which was considered a hit at the time. According to Conforth and Wardlow, his second, "I Believe I'll Dust My Broom" / "Dead Shrimp Blues", also "sold well", with an initial pressing of 5,000; and the next release, "Cross Road Blues" / "Ramblin' on My Mind", was "widely heard in the Delta", although neither song was considered a hit. Estimates for the remainder of Johnson's 78 catalogue only show numbers for the secondary labels; Perfect, Oriole, and Romeo pressed an additional 5,550 copies of Johnson's first eight (out of his total of 12) records. By December 1938, Vocalion only included six of Johnson's records in its catalogue, but issued a last, "Love in Vain Blues" / "Preachin' Blues" in February 1939.

Johnson's first albums, King of the Delta Blues Singers (1961) and King of the Delta Blues Singers, Vol. II (1970), were popular with critics and musicians, but failed to sell sufficiently to reach the Billboard charts.  However, after Columbia released The Complete Recordings (1990) box set, it reached number 80 on the magazine's Top Pop Albums chart in 1991 and, in 1994, was certified platinum (one million copies sold) by the Recording Industry Association of America (RIAA).

Footnotes

References

Bibliography

Blues discographies
Discographies of American artists